Ruffer Investment Company is a large British investment company dedicated to investments in internationally listed or quoted equities or equity related securities. Established in 1994, the company is listed on the London Stock Exchange and is a constituent of the FTSE 250 Index. The chairman is Chris Russell. It is managed by Ruffer Investment Management Limited, a business of which Jonathan Ruffer is the chairman.

Ruffer’s single investment strategy is defined by two simple investment objectives: not to lose money in any 12 month period and generate returns meaningfully ahead of the return on cash.

References

Investment trusts of the United Kingdom